TeraStorm is a 2022 Kenyan computer-animated science fiction film directed, written, and animated by Andrew Kaggia. The film was animated entirely using the Unreal Engine. It was selected as the Kenyan entry for Best International Film at the 95th Academy Awards, making it the first African animated film to be selected to compete for this award. It is the first original African-scripted animated feature with African characters and context to be submitted for consideration for the Academy Award for Best International Feature at the Oscars.

Synopsis 
Set in a fictional Nairobi, a group of African superheroes join forces in an attempt to defeat an ancient wizard who threatens to destroy the earth with a powerful and mysterious artifact.

Cast 

 Ali Mwangola as Victor
 Arabron Nyyneque as Eli-Ra
 Melvin Alusa as Ammadu
 Mungai Kiroga as Adrian
 Sara Muhoho as Nuru
 Peter Mudamba as General Maxwell

References 

Kenyan animation
2022 films
2022 animated films
2022 action adventure films
2022 science fiction action films
2020s English-language films
2020s animated superhero films